Tage Nielsen (16 January 1929 in Frederiksberg – 23 March 2003) was a Danish composer. He studied with Rued Langgaard and worked for Danish Radio as well as being a professor at the Danish Academy of Music.

Works, editions and recordings
 Giardino Magico: Il giardino magico. Passacaglia. Konzertstuck for piano and 11 instruments. Jean Thorel

References

1929 births
2003 deaths
Danish composers
Danish music historians
Male composers
People from Frederiksberg
20th-century male musicians